Ismat Beg, FPAS, FIMA, (born January 1951) is a Pakistani mathematician and researcher. Beg is a senior Full Professor at the Lahore School of Economics, Higher Education Commission Distinguished National Professor and an honorary full professor at the Mathematics Division of the Institute for Basic Research, Florida, US. He has an enthusiastic and interactive teaching style. He is famous for saying “please come on the board” when posed with a question in class. This helps uplift the students’ confidence.

Beg's scientific contributions cover a wide range of topics spanning fixed point theory and approximations, order structure, fuzzy sets and systems, artificial intelligence and multicriteria decision theory.

Early life and education

Ismat Beg was born in a small hilly village Mohri Sharif, west of Kharian in 1951 to a migrated Kashmiri family. He got his primary schooling in village school sitting under trees. In 1961 his father took him to Risalpur and he was sent to Sapper Boys High School, Risalpur Cantt. After passing Secondary School Certificate in 1966 he joined Zamindar College, Bhimber Road, Gujrat (now Government Zamindar College, Gujrat) for Higher Secondary School Certificate and Bachelor of Science. He did his master's degree at Government College, Lahore (now Government College University (Lahore)).

In 1977, Beg travelled to Romania on a scholarship which he applied and qualified. In 1977–78, Beg attended the West University of Timișoara for Romanian language and pre-doctoral courses and passed the PhD entrance exam for the University of Bucharest. He started his PhD in fall of 1978 under the supervision of academician . His area of research is ordered vector spaces and linear operators with specialization in integral representation of linear operators. He defended his thesis in December 1981 and degree was awarded in 1982.

Academic career
Ismat Beg started teaching just after his PhD in 1982 and has served  in 
 Lahore School of Economics
 Lahore University of Management Sciences
 Kuwait University
 Quaid-i-Azam University
 International Centre for Theoretical Physics
 Pakistan Navy Engineering College, National University of Sciences and Technology
 Nankai University
 University of Central Punjab

He has published research papers in the fields of mathematics, computer science, economics, game theory, engineering, decision theory and social sciences that have been well cited by other researchers. He has contributed to the fields of fixed point theory, fuzzy set theory, order structures, preference modeling and multi-criteria multi-agent decision making. Beg has supervised 12 M.Phil. theses, 7 Ph.D. dissertations, and 10 post doctoral researchers. He is member of the editorial boards of
 Proceeding Pakistan Academy of Sciences
 Journal Function Spaces
 Topological Algebra and its Applications
 Punjab University Journal of Mathematics
 Military Technical Courier (journal)

Awards and honours
 Distinguished National Professor, Higher Education Commission (Pakistan)
 Prize, National Book Council of Pakistan, 1986 
 Gold Medal, Pakistan Academy of Sciences 2008
 Visiting Mathematician / Associate Group Member / Senior Mathematician / Senior Guest Scientist, International Centre for Theoretical Physics Trieste, Italy, 1990–2010
 Academic Roll of Honor from Government College University (Lahore) 1972

Fellowships and memberships

 Fellow of the Pakistan Academy of Sciences
 Fellow of the Institute of Mathematics and its Applications
 Senior Member London Mathematical Society
 Member, American Mathematical Society
 Member European Mathematical Society
 Chartered Mathematician
 Member, European Society for Fuzzy Logic and Technology working group "Intuitionistic Fuzzy Sets: Theory, Applications and Related Topics"
 Life member All Pakistan Mathematical Association

Key publications 
 1992. "Fixed points of asymptotically regular multivalued mappings", J. Austral. Math. Soc., (Series-A) 53(3), 313-326.
 1995. "Random extension theorems", J. Math. Anal. Appl., 196(1), 43-52. 
 2000. "Fuzzy closed graph fuzzy multi-functions", Fuzzy Sets & Systems, 115(3), 451 – 454.
 2002 "Approximation of random fixed points in normed spaces", Nonlinear Anal.: Theory, Methods & Appl., 51(8), 1363-1372.
 2006. "Iterative procedures for solution of random operator equations in Banach spaces", J. Math. Anal. Appl., 315(1), 181-201.
 2009. "Similarity measures for fuzzy sets", Applied & Comp. Math., 8, 192-202
 2009. "Fixed point for set valued mappings satisfying an implicit relation in partially ordered metric spaces",Nonlinear Anal.:Theory,Methods & Appl.,71(9), 3699-3704 
 2011. "Numerical representation of product transitive complete fuzzy orderings", Math. & Computer Modelling, 153, 617-623. 
 2013. "TOPSIS for hesitant fuzzy linguistic term sets", Int. J. Intelligent Systems, 28, 1162–1171.  
 2016. "Incomplete interval valued fuzzy preference relations", Information Sciences, 348, 15–24. 
 2018. "Human attitude analysis based on fuzzy soft differential equations with Bonferroni mean", Computational & Applied Math., 37(3), 2632-2647.
 2021. "Fixed point of multivalued contractions by altering distances with application to nonconvex Hammerstein type integral inclusions", Fixed Point Theory, 22(1), 327 – 342.
 2023. "Dissilient interpersonal influences in social network analysis", Fuzzy Sets Systems, (2023)
For complete list of publications see.

See also
 Ghalib

References

External links
 IDEAS/RePEc

Fellows of Pakistan Academy of Sciences
Fellows of the Institute of Mathematics and its Applications
Artificial intelligence researchers
20th-century Pakistani mathematicians
21st-century Pakistani mathematicians
Functional analysts
Approximation theorists
Operator theorists
Mathematical economists
Scientists from Lahore
Members of the Pakistan Philosophical Congress
Pakistani people of Kashmiri descent
Academic staff of Lahore School of Economics
Academic staff of Lahore University of Management Sciences
Academic staff of Kuwait University
Academic staff of Quaid-i-Azam University
Academic staff of the Government College University, Lahore
University of Bucharest alumni
Government College University, Lahore alumni
University of the Punjab alumni
Punjabi academics
Gujrat
People from Kharian
1951 births
Living people